Stefano Amadio (born 5 January 1989) is an Italian footballer who plays as a midfielder for  club Latina.

Career
He made his Serie C debut for Teramo on 17 September 2014 in a game against Ancona.

On 10 January 2020, he signed a 1.5-year contract with Serie C club Fano.

References

External links
 

1989 births
Living people
Footballers from Rome
Italian footballers
Association football midfielders
Serie B players
Serie C players
Atletico Roma F.C. players
Pol. Alghero players
S.S. Chieti Calcio players
F.C. Aprilia Racing Club players
S.S. Teramo Calcio players
Latina Calcio 1932 players
Alma Juventus Fano 1906 players